The 1996 Fiji rugby union tour of Hong Kong were a series of matches played in September and October in Hong Kong by the Fiji national rugby union team.

Results 
Scores and results list Fiji's points tally first.

References 
 

1996
1996
1996 rugby union tours
tour
1996 in Asian rugby union